SF Hall of Fame may refer to:

The San Francisco Hall of Fame
The San Francisco 49ers Hall of Fame
Science Fiction Hall of Fame (disambiguation)